Nanorana arnoldi (common name: Arnold's paa frog) is a large species of frog in the family Dicroglossidae.
It is found in southwestern China (Tibet, Yunnan), northern Myanmar, eastern Nepal, and adjacent northeastern India.
Its natural habitats are subtropical or tropical moist montane forest, rivers, and freshwater springs.
It is primarily threatened by collection for consumption, but also by habitat loss.

References

arnoldi
Amphibians of Myanmar
Amphibians of China
Frogs of India
Amphibians of Nepal
Fauna of Tibet
Taxonomy articles created by Polbot
Amphibians described in 1975